Fernando Gutiérrez may refer to:

Fernando Gutiérrez Tello (fl. 1304–1323), Castilian nobleman
Fernando Gutiérrez (bishop) (d. 1327)
Fernando Gutiérrez Barrios (1927–2000), Mexican politician
Fernando Gutiérrez Fernández (b. 1980), Chilean footballer

Human name disambiguation pages